The 1895 Central Colonels football team represented Central University in Richmond, Kentucky during the 1895 college football season.

Schedule

References

Central
Eastern Kentucky Colonels football seasons
Central Colonels football